Ernest Edmund Bedford May (14 September 1878 Bartlow, Cambridgeshire – 5 January 1952) was a British track and field athlete who competed in the 1908 Summer Olympics.

He was born at Edale and died in Ellingham. He attended Haileybury School and Oriel College, Oxford.  He was an Anglican clergyman, Chaplain of Christ Church, Oxford and a Minor Canon of Durham Cathedral.

In 1908 he participated in the discus throw competition, in the Greek discus throw event, in the freestyle javelin throw competition, in the javelin throw event, and in the hammer throw competition but in all these competitions his final ranking is unknown.

References

External links
Ernest May. Sports Reference. Retrieved on 2015-02-01.
profile

1878 births
1952 deaths
British male discus throwers
British male hammer throwers
English male javelin throwers
English male discus throwers
English male hammer throwers
People from South Cambridgeshire District
Olympic athletes of Great Britain
Athletes (track and field) at the 1908 Summer Olympics
People from Edale
Sportspeople from Derbyshire
People educated at Haileybury and Imperial Service College
Alumni of Oriel College, Oxford